Gause may refer to:

Gause (surname)
Gause, Texas, United States
gause meter, an electronic device also known as an "EMF Meter".
GAUSE-17, a US Navy designation for the M134 Minigun.

Schools in the United States
Gause Academy of Leadership and Applied Technology in Bartow, Florida
Gause Riverside Academy in Fort Meade, Florida
Gause Elementary in Washougal, Washington
Gause Elementary in Gause, Texas
Gause Junior High in Gause, Texas

Related
 Gauze fabric